Bettman is a surname. Notable people with the surname include:

Alfred Bettman (1873–1945), American urban planner
Gary Bettman (born 1952), American sports executive
Gilbert Bettman (1881–1942), American politician

People with the similar Bettmann include:
Otto Bettmann (1903–1998), German archivist
Siegfried Bettmann (1863–1951), Anglo-German cycle and motor vehicle manufacturer

See also
Bettman Preserve, a park in Cincinnati, Ohio, United States